Ernesto Ganelli  (24 February 1901 – 9 September 1985) was an Italian civil engineer who designed various public and religious buildings in Tuscany.

Biography
Born in Alessandria, Ganelli graduated in civil engineering at the Sapienza University of Rome in 1924. He moved to Grosseto, Tuscany, where he became one of the most influential civil engineers and architects of that city. In his career he designed hundreds of public, religious and private buildings in southern Tuscany, and he designed almost all of the churches built in the dioceses of Grosseto and Pitigliano-Sovana-Orbetello during the 20th century.

Works (selection)

 Palazzo ONMI (1933–1934) in Grosseto
 Elementary School (1934) in Sassofortino
 Restoration of Palazzo Stella d'Italia (1934) in Grosseto
 Episcopal Seminary (1934–1936) in Grosseto
 Church of San Giuseppe (1935–1940) in Grosseto
 Church of San Guglielmo d'Aquitania (1935–1940) in Braccagni
 Clergy house of the Grosseto Cathedral (1936) in Grosseto
 Orphanage for boys "Giuseppe Garibaldi" (1936) in Grosseto
 Orphanage for girls "San Lorenzo" (1936) in Grosseto
 Church of Medaglia Miracolosa (1936–1937) a Grosseto
 Episcopal Seminary (1936) in Roccatederighi
 Church of Santi Paolo e Barbara (1938–1941) in Ribolla
 Church of San Rocco (1946–1948) in Marina di Grosseto
 Church of San Giuseppe Benedetto Cottolengo (1946–1951) in Grosseto
 Medical Dispensary (1948–1952) in Massa Marittima
 Villa Pizzetti Hospital (1948–1952) in Grosseto
 Agricultural Technical Institute (1949–1953) in Grosseto
 Church of Santa Maria Ausliatrice (1950) in Marrucheti
 Medical Dispensary (1950-1955) in Orbetello
 Church of Santa Maria Goretti (1951–1952) in Fonteblanda
 Retirement home "Francini" (1952) in Grosseto
 Church of Santa Maria delle Grazie (1953–1957) in Albinia
 Basilica of Sacro Cuore di Gesù (1954–1958) in Grosseto
 Church of Apparizione (1956) in Montenero, Livorno
 Church of San Giuseppe Lavoratore (1956–1957) in Bagno di Gavorrano
 Church of Santi Lorenzo e Mamiliano (1958) in Giglio Porto
 Church of Santa Margherita (1958) in Poggi del Sasso
 Church of Madonna del Rosario (1958) in Pian d'Alma
 Church of San Donato (1958–1961) in San Donato
 Church of Nostra Signora del Sacro Cuore (1959) in Bagnore
 Church of San Giovanni (1963) in Semproniano
 Restoration of the church of Misercordia (1968) in Grosseto

References

Bibliography

External links

20th-century Italian engineers
Architects from Tuscany
Italian civil engineers
1901 births
1985 deaths
People from Grosseto